Chinese simplification may refer to:

Simplified Chinese characters, standardised Chinese characters promulgated by the People's Republic of China
Chinese Character Simplification Scheme, a scheme to introduce the simplified Chinese characters
Shinjitai, simplified Chinese characters, or Kanji used in Japan

See also
Template:Table Hanzi
Chinese characters